Bommireddy Nagi Reddi (2 December 1912 – 25 February 2004) was an Indian film producer and director mainly in Telugu cinema. He set up Vijaya Vauhini Studios in Chennai, which was then Asia's biggest film studio. As his elder brother (who was also a director) had the same initials and was known as B. N. Reddi, Nagi Reddi was popularly known as B. Nagi Reddi. Some of the movies produced by Nagi Reddi include Patala Bhairavi (1951), Missamma (1955), Maya Bazaar (1957), Gundamma Katha (1962), Maduve Maadi Nodu (1965-Kannada), Enga Veetu Pillai (1965), Ram Aur Shyam (1967), Nam Naadu (1969-Tamil), Shriman Shrimati (1982), Julie (1975), and Swarg Narak (1978), the latter two of which were in Hindi. Reddi has served as the president of Film Federation of India twice, in 1960–61 and 1962–63.

Film career
Nagi Reddi along with his friend and partner Aluri Chakrapani produced over fifty films in four decades in the four South Indian languages and also in Hindi. He made mythological, devotional, and historical Telugu movies.  Some of his more notable films include Pathala Bhairavi, Maya Bazaar, and Missamma.  He made most of his films in association with screenwriter Chakrapani.  Nagi Reddi closed down Vijaya-Vahini after the Telugu film industry moved out of studios in the 1970s, and started the Vijaya Hospital and Vijaya Health Centre.

A new award was incorporated, commemorating his 100th birth year, the Nagi Reddi, memorial Award for the best Telugu and Tamil family entertainers.

Personal life
He was married and had 3 sons and a daughter and one of his son is a producer B. Venkatarama Reddi.

Awards
National Film Awards
Dada Saheb Phalke Award – 1986.
National Film Award for Best Feature Film in Kannada – Maduve Madinodu (1965)

Filmfare Awards
Filmfare Best Film Award (Telugu) – Maya Bazaar (1957)
 Filmfare Best Film Award (Telugu) – Gundamma Katha (1962)

Nandi Awards
 The Government of Andhra Pradesh awarded him the Raghupathy Venkaiah award in 1987.

Tamil Nadu State Awards
 The Government of Tamil Nadu awarded him the Kalaimamani Award in 1972.

Other Honours
 He was awarded an honorary doctorate by Srikrishnadevaraya University and Sri Venkateswara University.

Other businesses and philanthropy
Nagi Reddi served as chairman of the board of Trustees of Tirumala Tirupati Devasthanams between 1980 and 1983, and is credited for building the Vaikuntam Queue Complex that now serves to regulate pilgrims for darshan in the Tirumala Venkateswara Temple.
Nagi Reddi founded the Vijaya Medical & Educational Trust in 1972. The trust runs the Vijaya Hospital (1972), Vijaya Health Center (1987) and Vijaya Heart Foundation (1996). Nagi Reddi headed the South Indian Film Chamber of Commerce four times and the All-India Film Sammelan for two terms.

Nagi Reddi started the Andhra Jyothi newspaper in 1945. He also established the children's magazine Chandamama in July 1947. The magazine was eventually printed in nearly a dozen different languages.

He was the founder of Vijaya Hospitals in Vadapalani, Chennai.

Filmography

As producer
Shriman Shrimati (1982) (producer) (as B. Nagi Reddi)
Swayamvar (1980) (producer) (as B. Nagi Reddi)
Swarg Narak (1978) (producer) (as B. Nagi Reddi)
Yehi Hai Zindagi (1977) (producer) (as B. Nagi Reddi)
Shri Rajeshwari Vilas Coffee Club  (1976) (producer)
Julie (1975) (producer) (as B. Nagi Reddi-Chakrapani)
Ganga Manga (1973) (producer)
Ghar Ghar Ki Kahani (1970) (producer) (as B. Nagi Reddi)
Nam Naadu (1969) (producer) (as B. Nagi Reddi)
Ram Aur Shyam (1967) (producer) (as B. Nagi Reddi)
Enga Veettu Pillai (1965) (producer) (as B.Naggi Reddi)
Gundamma Katha (1962) (producer)
Manithan Maravillai (1962) (producer)
Paigham (1959) (Producer)
Appu Chesi Pappu Koodu (1958) (producer)
Maya Bazaar (1957/I) (producer)
Maya Bazaar (1957/II) (producer)
Missamma (1955) (producer)
Missiamma (1955) (producer)
Guna Sundari (1955) (producer as B. Nagi Reddi)
Chandraharam (1954) (producer)
Pelli Chesi Choodu (1952) (producer)
Patala Bhairavi (1951) (producer)
Shavukaru (1950) (producer)

As Presenter
Shriman Shrimati (1982) (presenter) (as B. Nagi Reddi)
Swayamvar (1980) (presenter) (as B. Nagi Reddi)
Swarg Narak (1978) (presenter) (as B. Nagi Reddi)
Yehi Hai Zindagi (1977) (presenter) (as B. Nagi Reddi) a.k.a. Yehi Hai Zindagi (India: Hindi title: video box title)
Julie (1975) (presenter) (as B. Nagi Reddi)
Prem Nagar (1974) (presenter) (as B. Nagi Reddi)
Ram Aur Shyam (1967) (presenter) (as B. Nagi Reddi)

In Editorial Department
Hai Hai Nayaka (1989) (assistant editor)

As director
Enga Veetu Penn (1966)

Thankful
Ram Tere Kitne Nam (1985) (sincere thanks) (as Shri Nagi Reddi)

See also
 Raghupathi Venkaiah Award

References

External links
 

1912 births
2004 deaths
Filmfare Awards South winners
Tamil film directors
Film producers from Andhra Pradesh
Dadasaheb Phalke Award recipients
People from Kadapa district
Film directors from Andhra Pradesh
20th-century Indian film directors
Telugu film producers
20th-century Indian businesspeople